Lee Radford (born 26 March 1979) is an English professional rugby league coach. He previously worked in rugby league as the head coach of Hull F.C., in the Super League, from 2013–2020. He is also a former professional rugby league footballer. 

As a player, he was an England international  forward who played for Yorkshire, and for Hull F.C. and the Bradford Bulls in the Super League.

Background
Radford was born in Kingston upon Hull, Humberside, England.

Playing career
Radford made his professional début for hometown club Hull Sharks before moving to Bradford in 1998. Radford played for the Bradford Bulls from the interchange bench in their 2003 Super League Grand Final victory against the Wigan Warriors. Having won Super League VIII, Bradford played against 2003 NRL Premiers, the Penrith Panthers in the 2004 World Club Challenge.

Radford later returned to his hometown club of Hull FC, who he joined for the start of 2006's Super League XI.

Radford would also play in Hull's 28-16 2008 Challenge Cup final loss to St Helens.

Lee Radford took part in a boxing match, the Rumble in the Humber, against fellow rugby league player, Stuart Fielden which raised £50,000 for Steve Prescott. He won the fight, stopping Fielden in the second round. He was appointed Hull's captain for 2007.

On 6 October 2011 Lee Radford announced his retirement from the game, to take up a 3-year deal as an assistant coach at Hull F.C.

Statistics
The table below shows a cumulative points and scoring records for Radford at the end of the 2012 Super League season.

International career
Radford won a cap for England against Wales while at Bradford Bulls in 2001. He played for England again in 2005 against, France and New Zealand. Radford again played for England while at Hull in 2006 against France, Tonga, and Samoa.

Coaching career

Hull FC
On 18 September 2013, Radford was unveiled as the new head coach at Hull FC, where he had been the assistant coach under Peter Gentle.  His first game in charge was a pre-season friendly against Doncaster, and his first competitive game was against the Catalans Dragons in Super League XIX.

After a shaky start to his coaching career he found success in 2016 becoming the first Hull F.C. coach to lead the team to a challenge cup victory at Wembley Stadium, the victory coming in the 2016 Challenge Cup final. The win came against Warrington Wolves with a score of 12-10.  Hull F.C. had previously lost 8 finals at the national stadium (despite having won the cup on 3 previous occasions at other venues).

That year he would also lead his team to the Super League play-off semi-finals but would fail to reach the final after being defeated by the Wigan Warriors 28-18.

Radford's coaching success would continue the following year when he once against led Hull F.C. to victory in the 2017 Challenge Cup final with an 18-14 win over the Wigan Warriors, having now led Hull F.C. to two Challenge Cup victories in a row.

Immediately after their loss to the Warrington Wolves on 12 March 2020, Hull FC chief executive Adam Pearson told a live TV interview that Radford had been sacked, minutes after the 38-4 loss.

Dallas Jackals
In June 2020, it was announced that Radford had joined Major League Rugby side Dallas Jackals as defensive coach.

Castleford Tigers
On 27 April 2021 it was announced that he would take over the head coach role for the 2022 season, on a two-year deal, when Daryl Powell leaves at the end of the 2021 season.
In round 1 of the 2022 Super League season, Radford coached his first game in charge of Castleford which ended in a 26-16 defeat against Salford.

On 6 March 2023, it was announced that Radford had left Castleford, by mutual agreement, with assistant coach Andy Last taking over as interim manager.

Honours

Playing career

Bradford Bulls
Super League: (2) 2003, 2005
Runner-up: (1) 2004
Challenge Cup: (1) 2003
World Club Challenge: (1) 2004

Hull FC
Super League
Runner-up: (1) 2006
Challenge Cup
Runner-up: (1) 2008

Coaching career

Hull FC
Challenge Cup: (2) 2016, 2017.

References

External links

Hull FC profile
(archived by web.archive.org) History → Coaches & Captains at hullfc.com

1979 births
Living people
Bradford Bulls players
Castleford Tigers coaches
England national rugby league team players
English rugby league players
Hull F.C. captains
Hull F.C. coaches
Hull F.C. players
Rugby league second-rows
Rugby league players from Kingston upon Hull
Yorkshire rugby league team players